Mandich is a surname of Croatian and Serbian origin. Notable people with the surname include:

Dan Mandich (born 1960), Canadian ice hockey player 
Jim Mandich (1948–2011), American football player

References

Croatian surnames
Serbian surnames